Strendur is a village on the Faroese island of Eysturoy, located along the Skálafjørður fjord. It is the seat and main settlement of the Sjóvar Municipality.

The 2012 population was 785. Its postal code is FO 490. Strendur means beaches or strands in the Faroese language.

The village is connected by road to Selatrað, Skáli and the rest of Eysturoy, and via the Eysturoyartunnilin to Runavík and Tórshavn.

References

External links
Danish site with photographs of Strendur

See also
 List of towns in the Faroe Islands

Populated places in the Faroe Islands